The 1991 Lipton International Players Championships was a tennis tournament played on outdoor hard courts. It was the 7th edition of the Miami tournament, and was part of the ATP Super 9 of the 1991 ATP Tour, and of the Tier I Series of the 1991 WTA Tour. Both the men's and the women's events took place at the Tennis Center at Crandon Park in Key Biscayne, Florida in the United States, from March 11 through March 25, 1991.

Finals

Men's singles

 Jim Courier defeated  David Wheaton 4–6, 6–3, 6–4
It was Jim Courier's 2nd title of the year and his 3rd overall. It was his 2nd Masters title of the year and overall.

Women's singles

 Monica Seles defeated  Gabriela Sabatini 6–3, 7–5
It was Aranxta Sánchez Vicario's 1st title of the year and her 7th overall. It was her 1st career Tier I title.

Men's doubles

 Wayne Ferreira /  Piet Norval defeated  Ken Flach /  Robert Seguso 5–7, 7–6, 6–2

Women's doubles

 Mary Joe Fernández /  Zina Garrison Jackson defeated  Gigi Fernández /  Jana Novotná 7–5, 6–2

External links
Association of Tennis Professionals (ATP) singles draw
Association of Tennis Professionals (ATP) doubles draw
Official website
WTA Tour final results: 1971–2007